Say Nothing may refer to:

 Say Nothing (album), or the title track, by Theory of a Deadman, 2020
 Say Nothing (book), a 2019 nonfiction book by Patrick Radden Keefe
 Say Nothing (film), a 2001 American film
 "Say Nothing" (Example song), 2012
 "Say Nothing" (Flume song), featuring May-a, 2022
 "Say Nothing", a song by Gabrielle Aplin from the 2017 EP Avalon
 "Say Nothing", a 2021 song by Wes Nelson

Other uses
 "Say Nothing (In the Absence of Content)", a 2020 song by Sharptooth

See also
 Say Anything (disambiguation)
 Say Something (disambiguation)